Vinod Kumar Singh   is an Indian television actor and model. He  played the title role in the show Ayushmaan.

Personal life 
Vinod Singh was born to Malati Devi and Shrinath Singh. He was born in Visakhapatnam, but was brought up in Mumbai. He and his twin sister are the youngest of 5 siblings. He did his schooling from Saint Francis D'Assisi High School, Borivali West. He went to Mithibai College for higher education. Later, he attended Terna Engineering College, Nerul, where he did Electronics and Telecommunication Engineering.

Career 
Vinod started his acting career with Ad Films. He has done around 424 ads, of which some were for huge brands like Close Up, Coca-Cola, Frooti, Onida, Nerolac Paints, Hero Honda, Sony Cyber-shot etc. He has also appeared in a few music videos. Babul Supriyo's music video Sochta hoon uska dil gave him overnight recognition.

Vinod made his television debut with Sab TV's comedy show Daddy Samjha Karo. This was followed by shows including Hip Hip Hurray, Dil se Dosti, Gharwali Uparwali,  and Bahuraaniyan. His breakthrough role was as the lead in Ayushmaan which made him a household name. He has played prominent roles in Ye Meri Life Hai, Amber Dhara, Ghar Ek Sapna and several other shows. He has also acted in Bollywood movies Stumped, Hum Tum and Daughter.

He has also done a musical play Black Market.

Television 
 Ayushmaan
 Ye Meri Life Hai
 Amber Dhara
 Arjun
 Ghar Ek Sapna
 Princess Dollie Aur Uska Magic Bag
 Dil Se Dosti
 Hip Hip Hurray
 Daddy Samjha Karo
 Bahuraaniyan
 Gharwali Uparwali
 Koi Jaane Kya Hoga
 Mahima Shanidev Ki
 Gubbare
 Rishtey
 Kagaar
 Yes or No
 CID
 Aye Dil-E-Nadaan
 Sssshhh...Phir Koi Hai
 Man Mein Hai Visshwas
 Supercops vs Supervillains

Filmography 
 Stumped
 Hum Tum
 Daughter

Other shows 
 Fear Factor
 Celebrity Fame Gurukul
 Boogie Woogie
 Kisme Kitna Hai Dum

References

External links 
http://entertainment.oneindia.in/television/news/2007/vinod-bollywood-debut-121107.html
https://m.imdb.com/name/nm1340599

Living people
Male actors from Visakhapatnam
Male actors in Hindi television
Male actors in Hindi cinema
21st-century Indian male actors
Year of birth missing (living people)